Synechodes andamanensis is a moth in the family Brachodidae. It was described by Kallies in 2004. It is found on the Andamans (India).

The wingspan is about 19 mm. The forewings are black with a yellow spot near the costa and a smaller yellow spot in the middle, as well as a small patch of yellow scales near the base and single yellow scales near the termen. The hindwings are deep yellow, with a black marginal band
and some black scales basally.

Etymology
The species name refers to the type locality.

References

Natural History Museum Lepidoptera generic names catalog

Brachodidae
Moths described in 2004